The President of Tynwald (Eaghtyrane Tinvaal) is the presiding officer at the sittings of Tynwald Court in Douglas and is elected by the members of Tynwald from amongst their number. The first elected president, Charles Kerruish, was elected in 1990 and held office until his retirement in 2000.

The presiding officer remains impartial but has, in the case of a tied vote in the Legislative Council on a division, has a casting vote. The President authorises the Order Paper for sittings, is responsible for controlling the procedure of Tynwald Court and for the authoritative interpretation of its Standing Orders. This is mostly mirrored in the office of the Speaker of the House of Keys.

Prior to 1990, the post was held ex officio by the Lieutenant Governor. The office is now held jointly with the Presidency of the Legislative Council (Eaghtyrane y Choonseil Slattyssagh).

At ceremonial occasions, such as the annual Tynwald Day ceremony or the proclamation of a new Lord of Mann, the President wears a full-bottomed wig and a blue damask cloak decorated with silver thread and Manx motifs. This cloak was designed by Charles Kerruish and draws inspiration from the carpet of the Tynwald Chamber. For other occasions, such as presiding over Tynwald during sittings for normal business, the Presidential dress code is the full-bottomed wig and a black cloak, akin to that worn by the Speaker of the House of Keys during sittings of the House.

List of presidents of Tynwald
ex officio the Lieutenant Governor, until 1990
Charles Kerruish, 1990–2000
Noel Quayle Cringle, 2000–2011
Clare Christian, 2011–2016
Stephen Rodan, 2016–2021
Laurence Skelly, from 2021

Kerruish, Cringle and Rodan had all served as Speaker of the House of Keys before assuming the Presidency.
Christian is Kerruish's daughter.

Deputy presidents of Tynwald
The Deputy President is generally the same as the Speaker of the House of Keys; consequently, the current Deputy President is Juan Watterson.

References

Tynwald
Isle of Man, Tynwald